Jean Felipe Nogueira da Silva, known as Jean Felipe (born 18 March 1994) is a Brazilian footballer who plays as a right back for Portuguese club Estrela da Amadora.

Club career
He made his professional debut in the Segunda Liga for Portimonense on 17 April 2016 in a game against Atlético CP.

References

External links
 

1994 births
People from Toledo, Paraná
Sportspeople from Paraná (state)
Living people
Brazilian footballers
Association football defenders
Club Athletico Paranaense players
Guaratinguetá Futebol players
Luverdense Esporte Clube players
Portimonense S.C. players
Varzim S.C. players
Associação Académica de Coimbra – O.A.F. players
G.D. Chaves players
S.C. Covilhã players
C.F. Estrela da Amadora players
Campeonato Paranaense players
Campeonato Brasileiro Série C players
Liga Portugal 2 players
Brazilian expatriate footballers
Expatriate footballers in Portugal
Brazilian expatriate sportspeople in Portugal